WENQ (92.3 FM) is a radio station broadcasting a Classic Hits music format. Licensed to Grenada, Mississippi, United States, the station is currently owned by Tammy Evans, through licensee Rayanna Corp.

References

External links

Oldies radio stations in the United States
ENQ
Radio stations established in 2003
2003 establishments in Mississippi